Foster Haven Rockwell (August 15, 1880 – January 26, 1942) was an All-American football player and hotelier.  A native of Vermont, Rockwell played football at Yale University and was selected as the quarterback on the 1902 College Football All-America Team and was a member of Skull and Bones.  He later served the head football coach at Yale in 1906, leading the team to a national championship.  He also coached football at the United States Naval Academy.  In 1911, Rockwell moved to Arizona where he owned and operated the Hotel Adams in Phoenix for more than 20 years.  He was also the founder of the Arizona Hotel Association.  Rockwell died in Phoenix at age 61 in 1942.

Head coaching record

References

1880 births
1942 deaths
American football quarterbacks
Navy Midshipmen football coaches
Yale Bulldogs football coaches
Yale Bulldogs football players
All-American college football players
Players of American football from Vermont